NCSoft Corporation (stylized as NC, formerly stylized as NCSOFT) is a South Korean video game developer and publisher headquartered in Pangyo, Seongnam, South Korea, primarily known for the distribution of massively multiplayer online role-playing games such as Lineage and Guild Wars.

History
NCSoft was founded in March 1997 by T.J. Kim. In September 1998, NCSoft launched its first game Lineage. In April 2001 the company created a US subsidiary under the name NC Interactive (based in Austin, Texas, and would later become NCSoft West) after acquiring  Destination Games, headed by Richard Garriott and Robert Garriott. In 2004, NCSoft launched two MMORPGs, Lineage II and City of Heroes.

The company formed NCSoft Europe in July 2004 as a wholly owned subsidiary with its main office in Brighton, England. They brought City of Heroes to several European countries on February 4, 2005, and have since established European service for WildStar and Blade & Soul as well. 

On April 26, 2005, NCSoft published Arenanet's first MMO Guild Wars Prophecies as well as Arenanets follow up campaigns Factions and Nightfall and the expansion Eye of the North. NCSoft also published Guild Wars 2 but stopped being the publisher for Guild Wars 2 in 2015 with the release of Heart of Thorns.

On September 10, 2008, NCSoft announced the formation of NCSoft West, a subsidiary which manages NCSoft's other western organizations, and established its headquarters for that subsidiary in Seattle, Washington. On July 28, 2021, NCSoft announced that it was adding the talents of long-time video game industry veteran Jeffrey Anderson (game designer) to its executive leadership team as the new CEO of NCSoft West, overseeing its games business in the Americas, EMEA, and Oceana regions.

In 2011, NCSoft purchased Hotdog Studio, a mobile game studio based in Seoul that produces phone and smartphone titles such as Dark Shrine.

In June 2012, NCSoft launched Blade & Soul, their first MMORPG since Aion launched in 2006.

In 2012 Nexon acquired a 14.7 percent interest in NCSoft for $688 million. Nexon sold all of its shares of NCSoft in October 2015.

On November 19, 2015, NCSoft West announced the formation of Iron Tiger studios, a developer based out of San Mateo, California focused on adapting Korean-made mobile titles for the West, as well as developing their own mobile games.

On August 21, 2020, NCSoft entered the Korean entertainment industry by launching a new subsidiary called "Klap Co., Ltd." Klap and NCSoft launched the entertainment platform UNIVERSE on January 28, 2021.

In March 2022, the Public Investment Fund of Saudi Arabia acquired a 9.26 percent stake in NCSoft, becoming the company's second largest shareholder after T.J. Kim.

Subsidiaries

Current
 ArenaNet
 Iron Tiger Studios
Klap (entertainment industry)
 Ntreev Soft
 NC Dinos

Former
 Carbine Studios
 Destination Games
 Paragon Studios

Controversies

Stolen source code
On April 27, 2007, Seoul Metropolitan Police said that seven former employees of NCSoft are suspected of selling the Lineage III source code to a major Japanese game company. According to NCSoft, the potential damages may exceed .

Worlds.com patent lawsuit
Worlds.com CEO Thom Kidrin claimed the idea of a "scalable virtual world with thousands of users" is patented by his organization and targeted NCSoft for patent infringement in 2008, in what he says will be the first of many lawsuits against MMO developers. On April 23, 2010, the Worlds.com case settled, but the terms of the settlement were kept confidential. On July 22, 2010, Worlds.com requested the case be reopened.

Richard Garriott termination
Garriott asserted in his suit that he was forced out of the company and was made to sell his 400,000 shares in NCSoft's stock, costing him millions of dollars. In addition, he claimed that the company was guilty of fraud by forging his resignation announcement. On July 30, 2010, a jury in a Texas federal court awarded him  in damages. NCSoft described Garriott as someone "who keeps finding different ways to turn the company into his personal ATM," and that "Garriott left the company voluntarily to catch his ride to the International Space Station." Citing his questionable work ethic and the failure of his video game project despite an $84.4 million investment, NCSoft pulled the plug on the game after which Garriott announced he would be leaving the company. This came after he boarded a much-publicized news on his boarding of a Russian aircraft, which cost $30 million.

Closure of Paragon Studios and City of Heroes
On August 31, 2012, NCSoft liquidated Paragon Studios and announced the closure of City of Heroes. Over 21,000 players signed an online petition contesting the shut-down and many used social media to promote their criticisms.

Games

In addition, NCSoft is also the developer and maintainer of a variety of web-based board games in Asian markets.

References

External links

 NCSoft
 NCSoft West

 
City of Heroes
Companies based in Gyeonggi Province
Companies listed on the Korea Exchange
South Korean brands
South Korean companies established in 1997
Video game companies established in 1997
Video game companies of South Korea
Video game development companies
Bundang